Kapi is an extinct genus of pliopithecoids that lived about 13.8 to 12.5 million years ago during the Miocene. The type species is K. ramnagarensis and it is known from a complete lower molar.

The holotype molar was discovered in 2015 in the Lower Siwaliks of Ramnagar in Jammu and Kashmir. On 8 September 2020, scientists in northern India described the fossil and named the new species K. ramnagarensis.

The generic name Kapi is from the Hindi term for a monkey. The specific name is after Ramnagar, where the type specimen was first found.

While originally believed to be an early hylobatid, recent research likens it more to a pliopithecoid.

References

Miocene primates of Asia
Fossil taxa described in 2020
Miocene primates